Sherman Irby (born March 4, 1968) is an American jazz alto saxophonist.

Irby was born and raised in Tuscaloosa, Alabama and found his calling to music at the age of 12.  In high school, he played and recorded with gospel immortal James Cleveland.  He graduated from Clark Atlanta University with a B. A. in Music Education, where he pledged the Alpha Phi Chapter of Alpha Phi Alpha fraternity in 1988. In 1991, he joined Johnny O’Neal’s Atlanta-based quintet.  In 1994, he moved to New York City, then recorded his first two albums, Full Circle (1996) and Big Mama's Biscuits (1998), on Blue Note Records.

Irby toured the U.S. and the Caribbean with the Boys Choir of Harlem in 1995.  During that tenure, he also recorded and toured with Marcus Roberts and was part of Betty Carter's Jazz Ahead Program together with Roy Hargrove.  After a four-year stint with Hargrove, Irby focused on his own group, in addition to being a member of Elvin Jones' ensemble and Papo Vazquez's Pirates Troubadours.

From 2003-2011, Irby was a regional director for JazzMasters Workshop, a mentoring program for young children.  He has served as Artist-in-Residence for Jazz Camp West, and as an instructor for the Monterey Jazz Festival Band Camp.  He was also a board member for several years for the CubaNOLA Collective. Irby formed Black Warrior Records and released Black Warrior, Faith, Organ Starter and Live at the Otto Club under the new label.

Irby is a member of the Jazz at Lincoln Center Orchestra with Wynton Marsalis. He first played with the orchestra from 1995 to 1997 and rejoined in 2005. Since rejoining , Irby, along with most members of the orchestra, has arranged much of the vast library of music that they have performed.  He has also been commissioned to compose new works, including “Twilight Sounds”, and his Dante-inspired ballet, “Inferno”

References

 https://www.jazz.org/jlco-sherman-irby/

Jazz alto saxophonists
Clark Atlanta University alumni
Living people
21st-century saxophonists
Jazz at Lincoln Center Orchestra members
1968 births
American jazz saxophonists